Hastata, a Latin word meaning hastate or spear-shaped, may refer to :
 a pointed leaf shape with barbs, shaped like a spear point, with flaring pointed lobes at the base

Species Latin name 

 B. hastata
 Bolbitis hastata, (E. Fourn.) Hennipman., a fern species in the genus Bolbitis
 G. hastata
 Galeana hastata, a flowering plant species in the genus Galeana
 L. hastata
 Lepechinia hastata, the pakata, a plant species in the genus Lepechinia
 N. hastata
 Nymphoides hastata, (Dop) Kerr., an aquatic flowering plant species in the genus Nymphoides

Subspecies and varieties 
 Ourebia ourebi hastata, the oribi, a small antelope species found in Zaire, Malawi and Zimbabwe
 P. trichocarpa subsp. hastata and P. trichocarpa var. hastata, two synonyms for Populus trichocarpa, a tree species

See also 
 Hastatus (disambiguation)
 Hastatum